Ernest Wright (10 November 1867 – 10 August 1940) was a New Zealand cricketer. He played first-class cricket for Auckland, Canterbury and Wellington between 1894 and 1901.

See also
 List of Auckland representative cricketers

References

External links
 

1867 births
1940 deaths
New Zealand cricketers
Pre-1930 New Zealand representative cricketers
Auckland cricketers
Canterbury cricketers
Wellington cricketers
Cricketers from Auckland